XHFEM-FM is a radio station in Hermosillo, Sonora. Broadcasting on 99.5 FM, XHFEM is owned by Grupo ACIR and carries its Match pop format.

History

XEYH-AM 1170 received its concession on March 23, 1988. It was owned by Proyección Radiofónica de Calidad, S.A. de C.V., a company of Juan José Espejo. By the early 2000s, the station had changed its callsign to XEFEM-AM under ACIR ownership.

It migrated to FM in 2011.

Match 

On December 26, 2019, Disney and ACIR announced they were mutually ending their relationship, which had covered twelve Mexican cities. Ten of the twelve Radio Disney stations, including XHFEM, were transitioned to ACIR's replacement pop format, Match.

References

Spanish-language radio stations
Radio stations in Sonora
Grupo ACIR